Hesketh may refer to:

 Hesketh, Alberta, a Canadian hamlet
 Hesketh Bank, a small agricultural village in Lancashire
 A series of Formula One racing cars, see

People with the surname
 Baron Hesketh: the various barons or lords Hesketh, who lived at Easton Neston in Northamptonshire, England
 Lord Hesketh: the Conservative Party politician, formally titled Alexander Fermor-Hesketh, 3rd Baron Hesketh
 Hesketh Racing: the 1970s Formula One racing team, formed by Alexander Hesketh
 Hesketh Motorcycles: the motorcycle brand, formed by Alexander Hesketh
 Chris Hesketh, English rugby league footballer
 Kenneth Hesketh, British composer
 Jake Hesketh, English association footballer
 Karne Hesketh, New Zealand-born Japanese rugby player
 Philip Hesketh, British Anglican priest and current Dean of Rochester
 Sean Hesketh, English rugby league footballer
 Thomas Hesketh, English politician
 Victoria Hesketh, English musician better known by her stage name Little Boots
 Barrie and Marianne Hesketh, founders of the Mull Little Theatre